Surender Pal Ratawal (born 2 October 1948) is an Indian politician and a leader of the Bharatiya Janata Party from Delhi. He was thrice elected to Delhi Legislative Assembly from  Karol Bagh in 1993, 2003 and 2008. He also served as a Minister for Social welfare and Minister of Tourism in Government of Delhi from 1993 to 1998.

References

State cabinet ministers of Delhi
Living people
Delhi MLAs 2008–2013
People from Karol Bagh
Bharatiya Janata Party politicians from Delhi
1948 births